Sangan Waterfall, is a waterfall located near Sangan Village,  north-west of Tehran.

External links 
Sangan waterfall in winter

Waterfalls of Iran
Landforms of Tehran Province